Elections to North-East Fife Council were held in May 1977, the same day as the other Scottish local government elections.

Turnout in contested wards was 48.7%.

Election results

Ward results

References

1977 Scottish local elections
1977